Jason Curtis Newsted (born March 4, 1963) is an American musician who was the bassist of thrash metal band Metallica from 1986 to 2001. He first performed with thrash metal band Flotsam and Jetsam from 1981 to 1986 before joining Metallica to succeed the deceased Cliff Burton. Newsted performed on the albums ...And Justice for All (1988), Metallica (1991), Load (1996), and Reload (1997), the most album appearances among Metallica's bassists.

After leaving Metallica, Newsted was a member of metal bands Echobrain and Voivod, using the pseudonym Jasonic for the latter, and toured with Ozzy Osbourne. He also fronted heavy metal band Newsted from 2012 to 2014. Newsted was inducted to the Rock and Roll Hall of Fame as a member of Metallica in 2009.

Early life 
Jason Curtis Newsted was born in Battle Creek, Michigan. He has two older brothers and a younger sister.
He grew up on a farm and at the age of six was given the responsibility of looking after animals. He was tasked with looking after hundreds of chickens and rabbits. He told author Paul Stenning, "It's where I learned about life – seeing a baby cow born right in front of your eyes when you're eight years old is pretty intense…I was from a very strong family and I was raised to be a strong, pure Americana farm boy."

Newsted's mother taught piano and one of his brothers plays trumpet. He was exposed to music as a child, listening to the record collections of his older brothers. His first instrument was a guitar, which he started to play at 9 years old, but he moved to bass at 14, after listening to Gene Simmons of Kiss. 

Newsted cites Geezer Butler of Black Sabbath as his major influence. He lists Lemmy Kilmister of Motörhead, Steve Harris of Iron Maiden, Peter Baltes of Accept, Geddy Lee of Rush, Rob Grange of Ted Nugent, and Bill Church of Montrose as other significant influences.

Career

Flotsam and Jetsam

Newsted's music career started with thrash metal band Flotsam and Jetsam, with whom he played bass from 1982 to 1986. He wrote the majority of lyrics for the their 1986 album Doomsday for the Deceiver.

Metallica

On September 27, 1986, during the European leg of the Damage, Inc. Tour, Metallica's bassist Cliff Burton died when the band's tour bus crashed. Following Burton's death, the group began a search for a new bassist. They considered and auditioned over 50 musicians, including Greg Christian of Testament, Gene Gilfen of Blind Illusion, Mel Sanchez of Abattoir, Mike Jastremski of Heathen, Troy Gregory, Les Claypool, David Ellefson of Megadeth and various others. Newsted was the last in line and ended up winning the part. 

Newsted said in a 2015 interview that he learned about Metallica's plan to open for Ozzy Osbourne's tour at the time. To his advantage, Newsted strategically procured the band's setlist, studied it, and presented it to drummer Lars Ulrich saying he knew all these songs, much to Ulrich's surprise. Two days later, Metallica invited Newsted back and told to him that he had been chosen to fill the bassist position. The band involved both of Burton's parents in the decision to choose Newsted. After the band broke the news to Newsted, Burton's mother hugged him tightly and said, "You are the one. Please, be safe."

Newsted's first live performance with Metallica was at the Country Club in Reseda, California, November 8, 1986. His studio debut with Metallica was on The $5.98 E.P. - Garage Days Re-Revisited in 1987 in which he was credited as ‘Master J Newkid’ in the liner notes. This was followed by his first studio album with the band, ...And Justice for All (1988), which was criticised for its undermixed bass guitar and thin tone. Newsted claims this was deliberate on the part of Lars Ulrich and James Hetfield, although both Ulrich and Hetfield claim they were also disappointed with the production of the album. They claim that most or all of Newsted's bass lines closely followed the rhythm guitar lines to the point of being indiscernible from each other. However, Steve Thompson, who mixed the album, claims that Ulrich was to blame for the inaudible bass and unusual drums. Thompson wanted to be relieved of his mixing duties when Ulrich presented his ideas on the production, but Thompson was not allowed to leave and received the majority of the criticism for the poor sound quality of the record. Nonetheless, the album peaked at number 6 on the Billboard 200 and projected the band to higher success.

Newsted also performed on the self-titled album Metallica (1991), which is the best-selling Metallica album to date, as well as on Load (1996), ReLoad (1997), and Garage Inc (1998). The live concert releases Live Shit: Binge & Purge and Cunning Stunts, produced in 1993 and 1997 respectively, also featured Newsted, as did the live album S&M in 1999. Newsted also played bass on the song "I Disappear" in 2000, his last studio appearance.

During his time in Metallica, Newsted also sang backing vocals on a number of Metallica songs. During tours, beginning in 1989, he would often sing parts of "Creeping Death", "Whiplash" and "Seek & Destroy", and he performed lead in most songs for three shows at the Summer Sanitarium Tour where Hetfield was recovering from injury.

He is known for his bass solo which included parts of "My Friend of Misery" (which Newsted had originally written as an instrumental) and bass parts from his former band, Flotsam and Jetsam.

He has co-written three Metallica songs:
 "Blackened" (...And Justice for All) (James Hetfield, Lars Ulrich, Jason Newsted)
 "My Friend of Misery" (Metallica) (Hetfield, Ulrich, Newsted)
 "Where the Wild Things Are" (ReLoad) (Hetfield, Ulrich, Newsted)

He performed his last live show as Metallica's bassist on November 30, 2000, at the My VH1 Music Awards.

Echobrain and departure from Metallica
During a meeting between the members of Metallica in January 2001, Newsted proposed that the band should take a year-long hiatus, and he would use that time to focus on his side-project Echobrain. When the other band members (specifically James Hetfield) rejected Newsted's proposals, he chose to quit the band. On January 17, as plans were being made for the band to enter the recording studio to record their eighth studio album, Newsted made his departure public, citing "private and personal reasons and the physical damage I have done to myself over the years while playing the music that I love." During a Playboy interview with Metallica, Newsted revealed that he wanted to release an album with Echobrain. Hetfield was against the idea and said, "When someone does a side project, it takes away from the strength of Metallica." Newsted countered his statement by citing Hetfield's contributions to other musical outlets. Hetfield replied, "My name isn't on those records, and I'm not out trying to sell them", and pondered questions such as "Where would it end? Does he start touring with it? Does he sell shirts? Is it his band?" Newsted's departure from Metallica, along with Hetfield's decision to go to rehab a few months later, almost led to a breakup of the band. After Hetfield rejoined Metallica, the band finished recording St. Anger, with record producer Bob Rock filling the bass slot. Robert Trujillo became the band's new bassist in 2003.

Newsted has stated that he has never regretted leaving the band. In a 2009 interview, he said "I tell you very honestly, one billion percent, I have never regretted leaving Metallica. It was the right thing for everyone. It was the right thing to do for the camp. That's it. I've never told anyone that I wanted to go back or anything like that—not once. I made up my mind. It was not an easy thing to do, but it was something I had to do. I thought about it very much before I pulled the trigger and because of that, I have never looked back. The past is where it's supposed to be." It was mentioned in the film Metallica: Some Kind of Monster that there was a rumor that Newsted would possibly rejoin the band, but to date it has not happened, aside from the brief appearance on the 30th anniversary shows.

Despite his departure from Metallica, Newsted remains close with the other band members. On April 4, 2009, Newsted joined Metallica for its induction into the Rock and Roll Hall of Fame in Cleveland, Ohio. He also performed three songs at the event—"Master of Puppets", "Enter Sandman", and "Train Kept A-Rollin'"—with Hetfield, Ulrich, Hammett, and Robert Trujillo, and Jeff Beck, Jimmy Page, Joe Perry, Ron Wood, and Flea. On December 5, 7, 9 and 10, 2011, Newsted reunited with Metallica during all four of their 30th anniversary shows and performed several songs with the band and, in some cases, other guest musicians. Hetfield noted how the fans "lit up" as Newsted walked on stage, smiling and waving to the crowd.

On December 16, 2013, Newsted expanded upon previous statements regarding his departure from Metallica and cited that his project with Echobrain was being discouraged by James Hetfield because Metallica's management at Q Prime wanted to go ahead with promoting Echobrain but was forced to drop it by Hetfield's demands with the quote "other arrangements can be made". Newsted was sure that Echobrain would not affect Metallica, explaining "And so they had told me, pretty convincingly, 'This is a great record, we've been playing it around the office, that's all I've been hearing, it's fantastic, this kid has a great voice. Let's do something with this.' That's what they told me, and then James Hetfield heard about it and was not happy. He was, I think, pretty much out to put the kibosh on the whole thing because it would somehow affect Metallica in his eyes, because now the managers were interested in something I was doing that had nothing to do with him". Newsted sums up the situation as follows: "I have no idea what [Hetfield] was thinking, other than just protecting what he valued, just like he does; that's his thing. He protects what he loves, squeezes it too hard, like he said himself. Squeeze it too hard, protecting it too much. That's where I was coming from. The people that I had counted on for 15 years to help me with my career, help Metallica, take care of my money, do all of those things, told me, 'Your new project is fantastic, we'd like to help you with it.' James heard about it, the manager calls me back a couple of days later – 'Sorry we're not going to be able to help you with that Echobrain thing'."

Ulrich admitted that Newsted's departure made a huge dent on Metallica, saying that his presence was overlooked.

Hetfield once revealed that the initial writing sessions without Newsted were unsatisfying and that "the music was not all it could have been." He also admitted in October 2022 that the song "All Within My Hands" was about Newsted's departure, stating that he used it as a means of documenting his internal problems, talking about how “love is control” in the lyrics and crushing everything in his hands to mold Newsted into doing what he was told.

After releasing three studio albums, Newsted left Echobrain in 2004 and the group disbanded a year later.

Ozzy Osbourne

Newsted joined Canadian thrash metal band Voivod in 2002. Coincidentally, he was also Trujillo's replacement in Osbourne's band during Ozzfest 2003, which included Voivod as a Second Stage act. During an MTV interview, both Osbourne and Newsted showed enthusiasm in writing an album together, with Osbourne comparing Newsted to "a young Geezer Butler". However, this would not come to fruition as Newsted left Osbourne upon finishing tour duties in late 2003. He would soon be replaced by Rob Zombie bassist Rob "Blasko" Nicholson.

Focusing on Voivod, Newsted recorded two albums before his participation in Rock Star Supernova, a supergroup created through reality television series Rock Star: Supernova in 2006.

Voivod

The fourth incarnation of Voivod featured three of the four founding members: Denis Bélanger (vocals), Denis D'Amour (guitar), and Michel Langevin (drums), with Newsted on bass guitar. D'Amour died at the age of 45 on August 26, 2005, due to complications from colon cancer. The record Katorz (a phonetic spelling of quatorze, the French word for fourteen), released in July 2006, was based around riffs found on D'Amour's laptop. 

A December 2008 update on Voivod's website noted that Newsted played "all the bass tracks" on their latest album Infini, which was released on June 23, 2009. Since then, Voivod reunited with their original bass player, Jean-Yves Thériault (Blacky), for a short period of time before he would leave the band permanently.

Rock Star Supernova

Supernova formed the basis of the second season of the CBS television program Rock Star in the quest to find a lead singer. The show began online on the Rock Star website on MSN on Monday, July 3, 2006 with an Internet exclusive weekly episode, and premiered on CBS on that Wednesday, July 5. Votes were cast via the website. On September 13, 2006, Lukas Rossi was crowned the winner.

Art career
Thanks to Lars Ulrich's interest in collecting art, Newsted became interested in the work of artists such as Jean Fautrier, Pablo Picasso, and Jean-Michel Basquiat. After leaving Metallica, Newsted took up painting as a hobby. He is a proficient artist and has displayed art around the United States.

While recovering from his shoulder injury in 2006, Newsted found solace through painting. Newsted has turned out a number of large original works of art over the last half a decade. Newsted said that he went "from making crazy and colorful music to making crazy and colorful paintings." His first gallery show opened on May 4, 2010, at Micaëla Gallery in San Francisco.

Rock and Roll Hall of Fame induction
On April 4, 2009, Newsted was present with his former Metallica bandmates James Hetfield, Lars Ulrich and Kirk Hammett, as well as Ray Burton, the father of late Metallica bassist Cliff Burton. He performed with the band alongside current bassist Robert Trujillo at the Rock and Roll Hall of Fame induction ceremony in Cleveland, Ohio. 

It was his first performance with the band in nearly a decade, their last performance together having taken place during the VH-1 Awards at the Shrine Auditorium in November 2000. Both Newsted and Trujillo performed onstage at the same time, which was a first for the band.

WhoCares
In October 2010 Newsted joined a supergroup with singer Ian Gillan and former keyboardist Jon Lord from Deep Purple, guitarist Tony Iommi from Black Sabbath, second guitarist Mikko Lindström from HIM, and drummer Nicko McBrain from Iron Maiden. The band, called WhoCares, recorded a charity single titled "Out of My Mind". The charity single also features a track titled "Holy Water" and is available as digital download or CD format as of May 6, 2011.

Newsted

In December 2012, Newsted formed his own band called Newsted with drummer Jesus Mendez Jr. and guitarist Jessie Farnsworth, with Staind guitarist Mike Mushok joining later in March 2013. The band released a four-song EP, titled Metal, on January 8, 2013. 

Newsted released its debut album entitled Heavy Metal Music on August 6, 2013. In September 2014, the band appeared inactive as its website contained only a brief message that as of September 15, 2014, Jason Newsted was no longer on any social networking sites. As of 2018, the Newsted official website has been deactivated.

He ceased touring with Newsted due to other musical interests as well as the band being unprofitable. He says "It cost me an awful lot of money – hundreds of thousands of dollars to take the Newsted band around to the 22 countries we played."

Jason Newsted and the Chophouse Band
In August 2016, after being out of the public eye for two years, Newsted formed a new acoustic group named Jason Newsted and the Chophouse Band, and had scheduled several performing dates throughout the fall. 

A fan-made video showed the band (with Newsted on acoustic guitar and lead vocals) playing the Woody Guthrie classic "This Land Is Your Land".

Equipment and bass rig 

According to the Jason Newsted Bass Rig he has used the following over the years.

Auditioning for Metallica (1986) 
After the death of Cliff Burton, Newsted auditioned early October 1986 using:

 Warmoth DIY Precision Jazz Bass
 BC Rich Eagle Deluxe (as a backup)

Damage Inc. tour (1986–1987) 
In Newsted's first shows with Metallica he used the

 ESP Surveyor (Precision Jazz model in grey)

This bass was also seen on the cover of the Garage Days Re-Revisited EP (released 1987).

On the promotion tour for this EP, Newsted was seen using

 ESP Horizon 5 string (in red)

Recording ...And Justice For All (1988) 
Recording engineer Flemming Rasmussen commented in an issue of Sound on Sound that Newsted used a 5 string Wal bass on the album.

 Wal Mk2 5 string

This bass was also seen in the video "One".

Damaged Justice tour 
The Damage Justice tour saw Newsted using a combination of 4 and 5 string Wals and the ESP 5 string Horizon.

These basses remained in his rig until August 1989, where on the "Binge and Purge" DVD Seattle show he was using Alembic basses.

Custom Alembic basses 
The Alembic basses were played live between 1989 and 1992 spanning the length of the Black Album's Wherever We May Roam tour.

The following models were used through this period

 Persuader
 Spoiler
 Elan 5 string with Jazz Precision Jazz configuration
 Europa 4, 5 and 6 string versions

According to Alembic he had at least 13 basses constructed with custom options, ranging from different wood types & electronics to changes in the contour of the body.

Recording the Black Album (1991) 
Newsted has played up to 25 basses in all, including 6, 10 and 12-string bass which were used for specific parts.

Primarily he used a 1981 Spector NS-2.

There is evidence supporting his use of:
 MusicMan Stingray
 Gibson Thunderbird

Wherever We May Roam tour (1991–1995) 
During this period, Newsted was using Stuart Spector designed basses.

 Custom Stuart Spector JN model (SSD JN4 and JN5) 4 and 5 string
 Spector NS-2

These basses featured black oil finish, piezo pickup option, fiber optic side markers and carved body contours.

Recording of Load and Reload (1996) 
Recording of Load and Reload began in 1996 and 1997 respectively and in an interview with Bass Player Magazine in 1996, Newsted again stated he used the NS-2 and a few other instruments to record.

 Spector NS-2
 1958 Fender Precision
 Dingwall Prima

Poor Touring Me tour (1997) 
Newsted began a very lucrative relationship with luthier Roger Sadowsky (of Sadowsky Guitars Ltd.) in which he made at least 20 custom basses.

Many of which are seen in the 1997 live show Cunning Stunts. The full list of Sadowsky basses are as follows;

 24-fret 5-string (fitted with EMG pickups #1)
 24-fret 5-string (fitted with EMG pickups #2)
 24-fret 5-String with Sadowsky Jazz pickups
 59′ Burst 4-string
 59′ Burst 4-string Vintage Jazz
 All Black 4-string Vintage Jazz
 All Black 5-string Vintage Jazz
 Black/White 4-String Vintage Jazz
 Black/White 5-String Vintage Jazz #1
 Black/White 5-String Vintage Jazz #2
 Cherry Red 4-string Vintage Jazz
 Cherryburst 4-string
 Cherryburst 5-string Vintage Jazz
 Lake Placid Blue 4-String Vintage Jazz #1
 Lake Placid Blue 4-String Vintage Jazz #2
 Lake Placid Blue 5-String Vintage Jazz
 Natural Ash 4-String Standard Jazz
 Sea Foam Green 4-String Vintage Jazz
 Sonic Blue 4-String Vintage Jazz
 Sonic Blue 5-String Vintage Jazz

The Sadowsky basses are either a 4 or 5 string PJ or JJ pickup configuration.

Garage Inc. and S&M (1998–1999) 
The Sadowsky basses were used to record Garage Inc. in 1998 and played on the Symphony and Metallica show in 1999.

Amplifiers 
From the Damage Inc. tour until the Black album (1986–1990), Newsted used an original 1974 Ampeg SVT head (300 watts). This was plugged into a 1×15" Ampeg speaker and 4×12" Mesa Boogie cabinet.

Post Black Album (1991–2000) 
From the Black Album onwards he used

 SVT II heads (x4)
 SVT 8x10" cabinets (x2)

Accompanying this was two off stage racks containing the following;

Amplifiers used for recording in Metallica

Recording the Black Album 
Newsted used a mixture of three or four amplifiers and bass pickups for the Black Album.

 An 18″ SWR (for the low end)
 Marshall guitar cabinet (for mid/high)
 Trace Elliot (for mid/high)
 Ampeg SVT (for the main sound)

He has also used this equipment in the past recordings

 Ampeg SVT Vintage
 Ampeg Heritage SVT-CL* (also known as the SVT-AV)
 Ampeg VB4

Philanthropy
In 2004, Newsted signed on as an official supporter of Little Kids Rock, a non-profit organization that provides free musical instruments and instruction to children in underserved public schools throughout the United States.

Personal life
Newsted was married in 1988 to Judy Talbert but the couple divorced in 1991 during the recordings of the Black Album. He is currently married to Nicole Leigh Smith, whom he wed in October 2012. She was his girlfriend of 11 years, to whom he refers as the "love of my life". While still his girlfriend, it was Nicole, an artist herself, who suggested he try painting. She now encourages Newsted to "move forward with his art".

Shoulder injury
On October 23, 2006, Newsted was injured while attempting to catch a falling bass amp head (which, according to him, was the bass amp that was used to record Metallica, Load, and Reload). The accident resulted in a torn anterior labrum in his left shoulder and a rotator cuff and biceps tear in the right. He was scheduled for immediate surgery, and underwent a lengthy rehab process. During this time he was unable to play, and began to express himself through painting. On January 4, 2007, he was back playing his bass again.

Newsted later reported that he had been addicted to painkillers, having taken such medication from his time in Metallica to cope with neck problems but without understanding the risks. After his shoulder injury the painkiller use became a problem, but Newsted said he had not used any since about 2010.

Discography

Echobrain
 Echobrain (2002)
 Strange Enjoyment (2002) (EP)
 Glean (2004) (writing credit on one song, producer)

Flotsam and Jetsam
 Doomsday for the Deceiver (1986)
 No Place for Disgrace (1988) (writing credits on three songs)
 Ugly Noise (2012) (credited for songwriting, but does not perform)

Gov't Mule
 The Deep End, Volume 2 (2002)

IR8/Sexoturica
 IR8 vs. Sexoturica (2002)

Metallica
 The $5.98 E.P. – Garage Days Re-Revisited (EP) (1987)
 ...And Justice for All (1988)
 Metallica (1991)
 Live Shit: Binge & Purge (1993)
 Load (1996)
 Reload (1997)
 Garage Inc. (1998)
 Cunning Stunts (1998)
 S&M (1999)
 "I Disappear" (2000)
 Six Feet Down Under (2010)

Moss Brothers
 Electricitation (2001)

Newsted
 Metal (EP) (2013)
 Heavy Metal Music (2013)

Papa Wheelie
 Unipsycho (2002)
 Live Lycanthropy (2003)

Rock Star Supernova
 Rock Star Supernova (2006)

Sepultura
 Against (1998) (track 14, "Hatred Aside")

Speedealer
 Second Sight (2002) (producer)

Tina Turner & Elisa Toffoli
 Teach Me Again (2006) (Single)

Unkle
 Psyence Fiction (1998)

Voivod
 Voivod (2003)
 Katorz (2006)
 Infini (2009)

WhoCares
 Out of My Mind / Holy Water (2011)

References

External links

 Music Legends Interview with Jason Newsted

1963 births
20th-century American guitarists
20th-century American singers
21st-century American singers
American heavy metal bass guitarists
American heavy metal guitarists
American heavy metal singers
American male bass guitarists
American male guitarists
American multi-instrumentalists
Guitarists from Michigan
Living people
Metallica members
Participants in American reality television series
People from Alamo, California
People from Battle Creek, Michigan
People from the San Francisco Bay Area
Progressive metal bass guitarists
Singers from Michigan
The Ozzy Osbourne Band members
Voivod (band) members